Oregon Route 221 is an Oregon state highway which runs between the city of Salem, Oregon and the city of Dayton, Oregon, roughly along the western shore of the Willamette River. It lies in Yamhill and Polk Counties.

Route description

OR 221 begins, at its southern terminus, at an interchange with OR 22 in Salem, just west of the Marion Street Bridge.  This intersection is a partial interchange connecting OR 221 directly only to and from downtown Salem. To connect to OR 22 westbound one must turn onto the surface Edgewater Street. To connect to OR 221 from eastbound OR 22 is more confusing as one must leave OR 22 at the Edgewater Street exit at the west end of Salem, travel on that street about one mile to Murlark Avenue.  One must turn north (left) there and travel to 7th Street where he turns east (right) to follow that street and Taggart Drive to Wallace Road (OR 221).

From the intersection with OR 22 in Salem the highway heads northwest, as an urban expressway known locally as Wallace Road;  upon leaving the Salem area it becomes a 2-lane country road, which roughly parallels the Willamette River to the east.  In some locations, the highway is right on the river's shore; in others it is some distance inland.

The highway continues north, into Yamhill County.  It passes near the community of Hopewell and through Dayton, terminating at an interchange with OR 18 and OR 233 just north of Dayton.   The last stretch of the highway, in Dayton, runs parallel to the Yamhill River, which empties into the Willamette just east of Dayton.

Major intersections

References

221
Transportation in Yamhill County, Oregon
Transportation in Polk County, Oregon